Howard Harrison "Jay" Haskell II (born December 4, 1939) is a former Republican member of the Pennsylvania House of Representatives.

References

Republican Party members of the Pennsylvania House of Representatives
Living people
1939 births